Station Invasion is a video game  for the 3DO.

Concept
A bunch of kids have bought out a local TV station and replaced all the adults, resulting in the creation of KID-TV. The station now plays six different shows, each of which is hosted by one of the six playable characters. Billy is the star of sitcom “I’m Grounded”, Angelica heads the soap opera “Sundaes of Our Lives”, Bryce is the host of “Mysteries Shmysteries”, ‘Sopha Sinfree’ runs a talk show named after herself, and Ernie is the host behind “What’s That Smell?”. Not among the playable cast are newshost Mary Carp and her cohost, John.

Gameplay
Station Invasion is a game in which kids solve puzzles to gain rating points.

Development
Development of Station Invasion was led by Ed Rotberg, previously a key figure on Battlezone. The project was developed in eight months. Paul Drury of Retro Gamer called the production of Station Invasion "painfully short".

Reception 

Next Generation reviewed the game, rating it three stars out of five, and stated that "If you're under eight, it's a scream."

References

External links 
 Club 3DO: Station Invasion at GameFAQs
 Club 3DO: Station Invasion at MobyGames

1994 video games
3DO Interactive Multiplayer games
3DO Interactive Multiplayer-only games
Children's educational video games
The 3DO Company games
Video games developed in the United States